Alajos Keserű (8 March 1905 – 3 May 1965) was a Hungarian water polo player who competed in the 1924 Summer Olympics, in the 1928 Summer Olympics, and in the 1932 Summer Olympics.

Born in Budapest, he first competed at the Olympics in 1924. As a member of the Hungarian water polo team he finished seventh. He played all four matches and scored one goal.

Also he was part of the Hungarian water polo team which won the silver medal in 1928 and the gold medal 1936. In Amsterdam at the 1928 Summer Olympics he played all four matches and was the top scorer of the tournament with ten goals. Four years later in Los Angeles he played one match. He died in Budapest.

See also
 Hungary men's Olympic water polo team records and statistics
 List of Olympic champions in men's water polo
 List of Olympic medalists in water polo (men)

References

External links
 

1905 births
1965 deaths
Hungarian male water polo players
Water polo players at the 1924 Summer Olympics
Water polo players at the 1928 Summer Olympics
Water polo players at the 1932 Summer Olympics
Olympic gold medalists for Hungary in water polo
Olympic silver medalists for Hungary in water polo
Medalists at the 1932 Summer Olympics
Medalists at the 1928 Summer Olympics
Water polo players from Budapest
20th-century Hungarian people